Robert Fadel (born in Tripoli, Lebanon, on 12 January 1970) is a political activist and philanthropist. He is a former Lebanese politician and retail business executive.

Political activism and Social activities 

Robert Fadel is an experienced political and private sector negotiator. He was a delegation member at the Taif conference to end Lebanon's Civil War, and subsequently served as an independent member of the Lebanese Parliament (2009-2016). During this time he joined Lebanon's National Dialogue Table in an effort to prevent civil war during the constitutional crisis following the vacancy of the head of state position. He attended more than 15 rounds of dialogues over an 18-month crisis (2014-2015).

After the collapse of Lebanon's economy led to protests in 2019, Fadel worked with a coalition of opposition parties and civil society actors to develop an alternative framework and political proposition to resolve Lebanon's political impasse. 

As a member of the board of directors of the International Crisis Group, Mr. Fadel has worked alongside its president to support several dialogue efforts to prevent or defuse regional and international conflicts, including the Venezuela political and constitutional crisis of 2019, in partnership with the Dialogue Advisory Group. He also participated in dialogue channels between KSA and Iran in the presence of other regional and international powers, to defuse a regional crisis after the withdrawal of the US from the JCPOA.

Political role 

Mr. Fadel was elected as an independent member of the Lebanese Parliament part of the March 14 coalition in 2009. He resigned in 2016 to protest the lack of reforms, rampant corruption and the absence of sectarian diversity in the newly elected municipal council of his city, Tripoli. He made history by being the first MP to resign before the collapse of the Lebanese economy.

Private sector career 

Robert Fadel also worked in the private sector, serving as Chairman & CEO of the ABC Group from 2009 to 2017, the leading shopping center and retail company in Lebanon ), of which he remains a member of the board of directors. Harvard Business School case “From Beirut with Love” summarized his experience as head of his family business. 
 
Prior to joining ABC, Robert Fadel worked as a consultant in Boston and Paris at the Monitor Deloitte Group, a global consulting firm specialized in business strategy and advice to governments.

Personal Information 

Fadel holds a master's degree in finance and economics from the Paris Institute of Political Studies and a post-graduate degree in Public Administration from ENA, the National School of Administration. Mr. Fadel chaired the school's Global Alumni Association in 2000, he also helped to establish an ENA school in Lebanon.

He has three children and was married to Hala Frangie until 2021.

References

1970 births
Living people
Members of the Parliament of Lebanon
Greek Orthodox Christians from Lebanon